Charlene R. Nunley (born 1950) was the first woman to become president of Montgomery College.

Formative years
Born in Pittsburgh, Pennsylvania in 1950, Nunley earned a B.A. in psychology from Penn State in 1972 and a M.Ed. in 1973. She earned a Ph.D. in Educational Policy Studies from George Washington University in 1986.

References 

Presidents of Montgomery College
People from Pittsburgh
Penn State College of Education alumni
George Washington University Graduate School of Education and Human Development alumni
1950 births
Living people
Women heads of universities and colleges